Sclerolobium hypoleucum is a species of tree in the family Fabaceae. As with other members of the genus Sclerolobium, this species is vulnerable due to indiscriminate logging for construction and craft wood. Its popularity is due to the wood being dense and heavy, making it durable for outdoor use. Propagation is by seed.

References

Caesalpinioideae
Plants described in 1850